Goniopholididae is an extinct family of moderate-sized semi-aquatic neosuchian crocodyliformes. Their bodyplan and morphology are convergent on living crocodilians. They lived across Laurasia (Asia, Europe and North America) between the Middle Jurassic (possibly Early Jurassic, see below) and the Late Cretaceous.

Description
Compared to modern crocodilians, goniopholidids are very unusual in several respects. They possessed two rows of rectangular, interlocking osteoderms like those of terrestrial crocodilymorphs like atoposaurids, that are relatively simple, do not extend far in their necks, as opposed to the ornate armours of modern crocodilians; likewise, unlike modern crocodilians but like many extinct forms like phytosaurs, they have ventral osteoderms as well. Their forelimbs are also proportionally very long, particularly in the humeri and wrist bones, being as long or longer than the hindlimbs, the opposite of the condition seen in modern crocodilians. Some like Anteophthalmosuchus also have forwardly oriented eyes, as opposed to the dorsally oriented eyes seen in modern forms. These suggest multiple biomechanical differences from modern species. The paravertebral armour is composed of two rows of paired osteoderms with the lateral margins ventrally deflected and an anterior process for a ‘peg and groove’ articulation.

Ecology 
Goniopholidids likely had a similar ecology to modern crocodilians as semi-aquatic ambush predators.

Evolutionary history 
Goniopholidids have only been found in Laurasia (Asia, Europe and North America). The oldest possible member of the group is Calsoyasuchus from the Early Jurassic of North America. However, its placement is disputed, with some studies recovering it as only distantly related to goniopholidids. The goniopholidids were present across Eurasia during the Middle Jurassic and were widespread in North America during the Late Jurassic and continued to remain prominent across Laurasia during the Early Cretaceous. Goniopolidids persisted into the late Upper Cretaceous in North America based on Denazinosuchus, from the Campanian-Maastrichtian of New Mexico, which is only known from fragmentary remains, and has been disputed as a member of the group, as well as remains of an unnamed goniopholidid from the Campanian aged Aguja Formation of Texas.

Classification
The following cladogram simplified after an analysis presented by Marco Brandalise de Andrade and colleagues in 2011.

References

Early Jurassic crocodylomorphs
Early Cretaceous crocodylomorphs
Sinemurian first appearances
Maastrichtian extinctions
Middle Jurassic crocodylomorphs
Late Jurassic crocodylomorphs
Late Cretaceous crocodylomorphs
Prehistoric reptile families